This article deals with historic administrative divisions of Czechoslovakia up to 1992, when the country was split into the Czech Republic and Slovakia.

For the current divisions of those two countries, see their main articles and the articles Regions of Slovakia and Regions of the Czech Republic.

History

1918–1923: different systems based on the former Austrian territories (Kingdom of Bohemia, Margraviate of Moravia, and Duchy of Upper and Lower Silesia) and former Hungarian counties in the north (later forming Slovakia (21 counties) and Subcarpathian Ruthenia (4 counties)) were reorganized into three provinces (– literally "lands") of Bohemia-Moravia-Silesia, 21 counties (župy) of Slovakia, and 4 counties of Subcarpathian Ruthenia (today's Zakarpattia Oblast in Ukraine); all provinces and counties were further divided into districts (okresy)
1923–1927: like 1918–1923, except that the above counties were replaced by 6 (grand) counties ((veľ)župy) in Slovakia and 1 (grand) county in Subcarpathian Ruthenia, and the number and borders of districts were changed in these two territories
1928–1938: 4 provinces: Bohemia, Moravia-Silesia, Slovakia and Subcarpathian Ruthenia; divided into districts
late 1938–March 1939: like 1928–1938, but Slovakia and Subcarpathian Ruthenia were promoted to "autonomous lands", while the border regions were ceded to Germany (so-called Sudetenland) and Hungary (southern parts of Slovakia and Subcarpathian Ruthenia)
1939–1945: Bohemia and Moravia became a protectorate of Germany, the remainder of Subcarpathian Ruthenia annexed by Hungary, while Slovakia was nominally independent 
1945–1948: like 1928–1938, except that Subcarpathian Ruthenia became part of the Soviet Union in 1945
1949–1960: 19 regions divided in 270 districts; Czech historical provinces/lands abolished
1960–1992: Ten regions plus Prague (and from 1970 also Bratislava), further divided into over 100 districts. Czech and Slovak Socialist Republics added as a layer above the regions at federalization in 1969.

1918-1948 division
From 1918 to 1928, the eastern Czechoslovakia, within what is now the Czech Republic, was divided into three administrative divisions known as lands: Bohemian Land, Moravian Land, and Silesian Land. The territories of Slovakia and Subcarpathian Ruthenia were divided into several regions.

From 1928 to 1939, Czechoslovakia was divided into five lands: Bohemian Land, Moravian-Silesian Land (including the Silesian branch office in the Moravian-Silesian Land), Slovakian Land, and the Subcarpathian Ruthenian Land.

1948–1960 division
The regions came into force on 24 December 1948. During this period, there were 19 total regions: 13 Czech and 6 Slovak as follows:

Czech regions

From 1954, the city of Prague was made into a city-region, separate from Prague Region.

 Brněnský kraj (Brno Region)
 Českobudějovický kraj (České Budějovice Region)
 Gottwaldovský kraj (Gottwaldov Region)
 Hradecký kraj (Hradec Králové Region)
 Jihlavský kraj (Jihlava Region)
 Karlovarský kraj (Karlovy Vary Region)
 Liberecký kraj (Liberec Region)
 Olomoucký kraj (Olomouc Region)
 Ostravský kraj (Ostrava Region)
 Pardubický kraj (Pardubice Region)
 Plzeňský kraj (Plzeň Region)
 Pražský kraj (Prague Region)
 Ústecký kraj (Ústí nad Labem Region)

Slovak regions
 Banskobystrický kraj (Banská Bystrica Region)
 Bratislavský kraj (Bratislava Region)
 Košický kraj (Košice Region)
 Nitranský kraj (Nitra Region)
 Prešovský kraj (Prešov Region)
 Žilinský kraj (Žilina Region)

Latest division (1960–1992)
The country consisted of 10 Regions ('kraje'), Prague, and (since 1970) Bratislava; further divided in 109–114 districts ('okresy').

The kraje were abolished temporarily in Slovakia in 1969–1970 and since late 1990 in whole Czechoslovakia. In addition, the two republics Czech Socialist Republic and Slovak Socialist Republic were established in 1969 during the federalization process. The word Socialist was removed from the republics' names in 1990 after the Velvet Revolution.

Since many regions changed significantly after the Velvet Divorce of 1993, here is list of their original names and current regions they approximately correspond to:

Czech (Socialist) Republic
 Praha: Prague
 Středočeský kraj: today Central Bohemian Region
 Jihočeský kraj: today South Bohemian Region
 Západočeský kraj (West Bohemian Region): today Plzeň Region and Karlovy Vary Region
 Severočeský kraj (North Bohemian Region): today Ústí nad Labem Region, and most of Liberec Region
 Východočeský kraj (East Bohemian Region): today Hradec Králové Region, Pardubice Region, and small parts of Liberec Region and Vysočina Region
 Jihomoravský kraj (South Moravian Region): today South Moravian Region, and most of Vysočina Region and Zlín Region
 Severomoravský kraj (North Moravian Region): today Moravian-Silesian Region, Olomouc Region, and part of Zlín Region

Slovak (Socialist) Republic
 Bratislava: today a part of the Bratislava Region
 Západoslovenský kraj (West Slovak Region): Trnava Region, Nitra Region, most of Bratislava Region, and a small part of Trenčín Region
 Stredoslovenský kraj (Central Slovak Region): today Žilina Region, Banská Bystrica Region, and a large part of Trenčín Region
 Východoslovenský kraj (East Slovak Region): today Prešov Region and Košice Region

See also
Czech Republic#Administrative divisions
Slovakia#Administrative divisions

References

Government of Czechoslovakia
Czechoslovakia